Norssi is the informal name of various schools in Finland:
 Helsingin normaalilyseo in Helsinki
 Turun normaalikoulu in Turku
 Oulun normaalikoulu in Oulu